

Events

Pre-1600
 473 – Gundobad (nephew of Ricimer) nominates Glycerius as emperor of the Western Roman Empire.
 724 – Empress Genshō abdicates the throne in favor of her nephew Shōmu who becomes emperor of Japan.
1575 – Mughal Emperor Akbar defeats Sultan of Bengal Daud Khan Karrani's army at the Battle of Tukaroi.
1585 – The Olympic Theatre, designed by Andrea Palladio, is inaugurated in Vicenza.

1601–1900
1776 – American Revolutionary War: The first amphibious landing of the United States Marine Corps begins the Battle of Nassau.
1779 – American Revolutionary War: The Continental Army is routed at the Battle of Brier Creek near Savannah, Georgia.
1799 – The Russo-Ottoman siege of Corfu ends with the surrender of the French garrison.
1820 – The U.S. Congress passes the Missouri Compromise.
1845 – Florida is admitted as the 27th U.S. state.
1849 – The Territory of Minnesota is created.
1857 – Second Opium War: France and the United Kingdom declare war on China.
1859 – The two-day Great Slave Auction, the largest such auction in United States history, concludes.
1861 – Alexander II of Russia signs the Emancipation Manifesto, freeing serfs.
1873 – Censorship in the United States: The U.S. Congress enacts the Comstock Law, making it illegal to send any "obscene literature and articles of immoral use" through the mail.
  1875   – The first ever organized indoor game of ice hockey is played in Montreal, Quebec, Canada as recorded in the Montreal Gazette.
1878 – The Russo-Turkish War ends with Bulgaria regaining its independence from the Ottoman Empire according to the Treaty of San Stefano.
1891 – Shoshone National Forest is established as the first national forest in the US and world.

1901–present
1910 – Rockefeller Foundation: John D. Rockefeller Jr. announces his retirement from managing his businesses so that he can devote all his time to philanthropy.
1913 – Thousands of women march in the Woman Suffrage Procession in Washington, D.C.
1918 – Russia signs the Treaty of Brest-Litovsk, agreeing to withdraw from World War I, and conceding German control of the Baltic States, Belarus and Ukraine. It also conceded Turkish control of Ardahan, Kars and Batumi.
1924 – The 407-year-old Islamic caliphate is abolished, when Caliph Abdülmecid II of the Ottoman Caliphate is deposed. The last remnant of the old regime gives way to the reformed Turkey of Kemal Atatürk.
  1924   – The Free State of Fiume is annexed by the Kingdom of Italy.
1931 – The United States adopts The Star-Spangled Banner as its national anthem.
1938 – Oil is discovered in Saudi Arabia.
1939 – In Bombay, Mohandas Gandhi begins a hunger strike in protest at the autocratic rule in British India.
1940 – Five people are killed in an arson attack on the offices of the communist newspaper Flamman in Luleå, Sweden.
1942 – World War II: Ten Japanese warplanes raid Broome, Western Australia, killing more than 100 people.
1943 – World War II: In London, 173 people are killed in a crush while trying to enter an air-raid shelter at Bethnal Green tube station.
1944 – The Order of Nakhimov and Order of Ushakov are instituted in USSR as the highest naval awards.
  1944   – A freight train carrying stowaway passengers stalls in a tunnel shortly after departing from Balvano, Basilicata, Italy just after midnight, with 517 dying from carbon monoxide poisoning.
1945 – World War II: In poor visibility, the RAF mistakenly bombs the Bezuidenhout area of The Hague, Netherlands, killing 511 people.
1953 – A De Havilland Comet (Canadian Pacific Air Lines) crashes in Karachi, Pakistan, killing 11.
1958 – Nuri al-Said becomes Prime Minister of Iraq for the eighth time.
1969 – Apollo program: NASA launches Apollo 9 to test the lunar module.
1972 – Mohawk Airlines Flight 405 crashes as a result of a control malfunction and insufficient training in emergency procedures.
1974 – Turkish Airlines Flight 981 crashes at Ermenonville near Paris, France killing all 346 aboard.
1980 – The  is decommissioned and stricken from the Naval Vessel Register.
1985 – Arthur Scargill declares that the National Union of Mineworkers' national executive voted to end the longest-running industrial dispute in Great Britain without any peace deal over pit closures.
  1985   – A magnitude 8.3 earthquake strikes the Valparaíso Region of Chile, killing 177 and leaving nearly a million people homeless.
1986 – The Australia Act 1986 commences, causing Australia to become fully independent from the United Kingdom.
1991 – An amateur video captures the beating of Rodney King by Los Angeles police officers.
  1991   – United Airlines Flight 585 crashes on its final approach to Colorado Springs killing everyone on board.
2005 – James Roszko murders four Royal Canadian Mounted Police constables during a drug bust at his property in Rochfort Bridge, Alberta, then commits suicide. This is the deadliest peace-time incident for the RCMP since 1885 and the North-West Rebellion.
  2005   – Steve Fossett becomes the first person to fly an airplane non-stop around the world solo without refueling.
  2005   – Margaret Wilson is elected as Speaker of the New Zealand House of Representatives, beginning a period lasting until August 23, 2006, where all the highest political offices (including Elizabeth II as Head of State), were occupied by women, making New Zealand the first country for this to occur.
2013 – A bomb blast in Karachi, Pakistan, kills at least 45 people and injured 180 others in a predominantly Shia Muslim area.
2017 – The Nintendo Switch releases worldwide.

Births

Pre-1600
1455 – John II of Portugal (d. 1495)
  1455   – Ascanio Sforza, Catholic cardinal (d. 1505)
1506 – Luís of Portugal, Duke of Beja (d. 1555)
1520 – Matthias Flacius, Croatian theologian and reformer (d. 1575)
1583 – Edward Herbert, 1st Baron Herbert of Cherbury, English-Welsh soldier, historian, and diplomat (d. 1648)
1589 – Gisbertus Voetius, Dutch minister, theologian, and academic (d. 1676)

1601–1900
1606 – Edmund Waller, English poet and politician (d. 1687)
1652 – Thomas Otway, English playwright and author (d. 1685)
1678 – Madeleine de Verchères, Canadian rebel leader (d. 1747)
1756 – William Godwin, English journalist and author (d. 1836)
1778 – Frederica of Mecklenburg-Strelitz (d. 1841)
1793 – William Macready, English actor and manager (d. 1873)
1800 – Heinrich Georg Bronn, German geologist and paleontologist (d. 1862)
1803 – Thomas Field Gibson, English manufacturer who aided the welfare of the Spitalfields silk weavers (d. 1889)
1805 – Jonas Furrer, Swiss politician (d. 1861)
1816 – William James Blacklock, English-Scottish painter (d. 1858)
1819 – Gustave de Molinari, Dutch-Belgian economist and theorist (d. 1912)
1825 – Shiranui Kōemon, Japanese sumo wrestler (d. 1879)
1831 – George Pullman, American engineer and businessman, founded the Pullman Company (d. 1897)
1839 – Jamsetji Tata, Indian businessman, founded Tata Group (d. 1904)
1841 – John Murray, Canadian-Scottish oceanographer and biologist (d. 1914)
1845 – Georg Cantor, Russian-German mathematician and philosopher (d. 1918)
1847 – Alexander Graham Bell, Scottish-American engineer and academic, invented the telephone (d. 1922)
1860 – John Montgomery Ward, American baseball player and manager (d. 1925)
1866 – Fred A. Busse, American lawyer and politician, 39th Mayor of Chicago (d. 1914)
1868 – Émile Chartier, French philosopher and journalist (d. 1951)
1869 – Henry Wood, English conductor (d. 1944)
1871 – Maurice Garin, Italian-French cyclist (d. 1957)
1873 – William Green, American union leader and politician (d. 1952)
1880 – Florence Auer, American actress and screenwriter (d. 1962)
  1880   – Yōsuke Matsuoka, Japanese politician, Japanese Minister of Foreign Affairs (d. 1946)
1882 – Elisabeth Abegg, German anti-Nazi resistance fighter (d. 1974)
  1882   – Charles Ponzi, Italian businessman (d. 1949)
1883 – Cyril Burt, English psychologist and geneticist (d. 1971)
  1883   – Paul Marais de Beauchamp, French zoologist (d. 1977)
1887 – Lincoln J. Beachey, American pilot (d. 1915)
1891 – Damaskinos of Athens, Greek archbishop (d. 1949)
1893 – Beatrice Wood, American illustrator and potter (d. 1998)
1895 – Ragnar Frisch, Norwegian economist and academic, Nobel Prize laureate (d. 1973)
  1895   – Matthew Ridgway, American general (d. 1993)
1898 – Emil Artin, Austrian-German mathematician and academic (d. 1962)
1900 – Edna Best, British stage and film actress (d. 1974)

1901–present
1901 – Claude Choules, English-Australian soldier (d. 2011)
1902 – Ruby Dandridge, African-American film and radio actress (d. 1987)
1903 – Vasily Kozlov, Belarusian general and politician (d. 1967)
1906 – Artur Lundkvist, Swedish poet and critic (d. 1991)
1911 – Jean Harlow, American actress (d. 1937)
  1911   – Hugues Lapointe, Canadian lawyer and politician, 22nd Lieutenant Governor of Quebec (d. 1982)
1913 – Margaret Bonds, American pianist and composer (d. 1972)
  1913   – Harold J. Stone, American actor (d. 2005)
1914 – Asger Jorn, Danish painter and sculptor (d. 1973)
1916 – Paul Halmos, Hungarian-American mathematician (d. 2006)
1917 – Sameera Moussa, Egyptian physicist and academic (d. 1952)
1918 – Arthur Kornberg, American biochemist and academic, Nobel Prize laureate (d. 2007)
1920 – Julius Boros, American golfer and accountant (d. 1994)
  1920   – James Doohan, Canadian-American actor and soldier (d. 2005)
  1920   – Ronald Searle, English-French soldier and illustrator (d. 2011)
1921 – Diana Barrymore, American actress (d. 1960)
1922 – Nándor Hidegkuti, Hungarian footballer and manager (d. 2002)
1923 – Barney Martin, American police officer and actor (d. 2005)
  1923   – Doc Watson, American bluegrass singer-songwriter and musician (d. 2012)
1924 – Tomiichi Murayama, Japanese soldier and politician, 52nd Prime Minister of Japan
1926 – James Merrill, American poet and playwright (d. 1995)
1927 – Pierre Aubert, Swiss lawyer and politician (d. 2016)
1930 – Ion Iliescu, Romanian engineer and politician, 2nd President of Romania
1932 – Roy Fisher, Australian rugby league player
1934 – Peter Brooke, Baron Brooke of Sutton Mandeville, English politician, Secretary of State for Northern Ireland
  1934   – Jimmy Garrison, American bassist and educator (d. 1976)
1935 – Mal Anderson, Australian tennis player
  1935   – Michael Walzer, American philosopher and academic
  1935   – Zhelyu Zhelev, Bulgarian philosopher and politician, 2nd President of Bulgaria (d. 2015)
1939 – Larry Burkett, American author and radio host (d. 2003)
  1939   – M. L. Jaisimha, Indian cricketer (d. 1999)
1940 – Germán Castro Caycedo, Colombian author and journalist
  1940   – Perry Ellis, American fashion designer, founded Perry Ellis (d. 1986)
  1940   – Jean-Paul Proust, French-Monégasque police officer and politician, 21st Minister of State of Monaco (d. 2010)
1941 – Mike Pender, English singer-songwriter and guitarist 
1945 – George Miller, Australian director, producer, and screenwriter
  1945   – Hattie Winston, American actress
1947 – Clifton Snider, American author, poet, and critic
  1947   – Jennifer Warnes, American singer-songwriter and producer
1948 – Snowy White, English guitarist
  1948   – Steve Wilhite, American computer scientist, developer of the GIF image format at CompuServe in 1987 (d. 2022)
1949 – Ron Chernow, American historian, journalist, and author
  1949   – Bonnie J. Dunbar, American engineer, academic, and astronaut
  1949   – Jesse Jefferson, American baseball player (d. 2011)
1950 – Kamal Ahmed Majumder, Bangladeshi politician
1951 – Lindsay Cooper, English composer, bassoon and oboe player (d. 2013)
  1951   – Andy Murray, Canadian ice hockey player and coach
  1951   – Heizō Takenaka, Japanese economist and politician
1952 – Rudy Fernandez, Filipino actor and producer (d. 2008)
1953 – Robyn Hitchcock, English singer-songwriter and guitarist
  1953   – Zico, Brazilian footballer and coach
1954 – Keith Fergus, American golfer
  1954   – John Lilley, American singer-songwriter and guitarist 
  1954   – Édouard Lock, Moroccan-Canadian dancer and choreographer
1955 – Darnell Williams, English-American actor and director
1956 – Zbigniew Boniek, Polish footballer and manager
  1956   – John Fulton Reid, New Zealand cricketer
1957 – Stephen Budiansky, American historian, journalist, and author
  1957   – Thom Hoffman, Dutch actor and photographer
1958 – Miranda Richardson, English actress 
1959 – Ira Glass, American radio host and producer
  1959   – Duško Vujošević, Montenegrin basketball player and coach
1960 – Neal Heaton, American baseball player and coach
1961 – Mary Page Keller, American actress and producer
  1961   – John Matteson, American biographer
  1961   – Perry McCarthy, English race car driver
  1961   – Fatima Whitbread, English javelin thrower
1962 – Glen E. Friedman, American photographer
  1962   – Jackie Joyner-Kersee, American heptathlete and long jumper
  1962   – Herschel Walker, American football player, political candidate and mixed martial artist
1963 – Martín Fiz, Spanish runner
  1963   – Khaltmaagiin Battulga, 5th President of Mongolia
1964 – Raúl Alcalá, Mexican cyclist
  1964   – Laura Harring, Mexican-American model and actress, Miss USA 1985
  1964   – Glenn Kulka, Canadian ice hockey player and wrestler
1965 – Dragan Stojković, Serbian footballer and manager
1966 – Tone Lōc, American rapper, producer, and actor
  1966   – Timo Tolkki, Finnish guitarist, songwriter, and producer
1968 – Brian Cox, English keyboard player and physicist 
  1968   – Brian Leetch, American ice hockey player
1970 – Julie Bowen, American actress
  1970   – Inzamam-ul-Haq, Pakistani cricketer and coach
1971 – Charlie Brooker, English journalist, producer, and author
  1971   – Tyler Florence, American chef and author
1972 – Darren Anderton, English international footballer and sportscaster
1973 – Xavier Bettel, Luxembourger lawyer and politician, Prime Minister of Luxembourg
1975 – Patric Chiha, Austrian film director and screenwriter
1974 – David Faustino, American actor, producer, and screenwriter
1976 – Fraser Gehrig, Australian footballer
  1976   – Isabel Granada, Filipino-Spanish actress (d. 2017)
  1976   – Keit Pentus-Rosimannus, Estonian politician, 28th Estonian Minister of Foreign Affairs
  1976   – Kampamba Mulenga Chilumba, Zambian politician
1977 – Ronan Keating, Irish singer-songwriter and actor 
  1977   – Buddy Valastro, American chef and television host
1979 – Albert Jorquera, Spanish footballer
1981 – Julius Malema, South African politician
  1981   – Emmanuel Pappoe, Ghanaian footballer
1982 – Jessica Biel, American actress, singer, and producer
  1982   – Colton Orr, Canadian ice hockey player
  1982   – Tolu Ogunlesi, Nigerian journalist and writer
  1982   – Brent Tate, Australian rugby league player
1983 – Ashley Hansen, Australian footballer
  1983   – Sarah Poewe, South African swimmer
1984 – Valerio Bernabò, Italian rugby player
  1984   – Santonio Holmes, American football player
  1984   – Alexander Semin, Russian ice hockey player
1986 – Jed Collins, American football player
  1986   – Stacie Orrico, American singer-songwriter
  1986   – Mehmet Topal, Turkish footballer
1987 – Jesús Padilla, Mexican footballer
  1987   – Shraddha Kapoor, Indian actress, singer, and designer 
1988 – Teodora Mirčić, Serbian tennis player
  1988   – Michael Morrison, English footballer
  1988   – Jan-Arie van der Heijden, Dutch footballer
  1988   – Max Waller, English cricketer
1989 – Erwin Mulder, Dutch footballer
1990 – Vladimir Janković, Greek-Serbian basketball player
1991 – Anri Sakaguchi, Japanese actress
  1991   – Cho-rong, South Korean singer 
1993 – Gabriela Cé, Brazilian tennis player
  1993   – Josef Dostál, Czech kayaker
  1993   – James Roberts, Australian rugby league player
1994 – Umika Kawashima, Japanese singer and actress
1995 – Maine Mendoza, Filipina actress
1996 – Cameron Johnson, American basketball player
  1996   – Andile Phehlukwayo, South African cricketer
1997 – Camila Cabello, Cuban-American singer
1998 – Jayson Tatum, American basketball player

Deaths

Pre-1600
 532 – Winwaloe, founder of Landévennec Abbey (b. c. 460)
1009 – Abd al-Rahman Sanchuelo, Umayyad chief minister (b. 983)
1195 – Hugh de Puiset, bishop of Durham (b. c. 1125)
1239 – Vladimir IV Rurikovich, Grand Prince of Kiev (b. 1187)
1311 – Antony Bek, bishop of Durham
1323 – Andrew Harclay, 1st Earl of Carlisle, English military leader
1383 – Hugh III, Italian nobleman 
1459 – Ausiàs March, Catalan knight and poet (b. 1397)
1542 – Arthur Plantagenet, 1st Viscount Lisle, illegitimate son of Edward IV
1554 – John Frederick I, Elector of Saxony (b. 1503)
1578 – Sebastiano Venier, doge of Venice (b. 1496)
  1578   – Michael Kantakouzenos Şeytanoğlu, Ottoman Greek magnate
1588 – Henry XI, duke of Legnica (b. 1539)
1592 – Michael Coxcie, Flemish painter (b. 1499)

1601–1900
1611 – William Douglas, 10th Earl of Angus, Scottish nobleman (b. 1552)
1616 – Matthias de l'Obel, Flemish physician and botanist (b. 1538)
1700 – Chhatrapati Rajaram, 3rd Chhatrapati of Maratha Empire (b. 1670)
1703 – Robert Hooke, English architect and philosopher (b. 1635)
1744 – Jean Barbeyrac, French scholar and jurist (b. 1674)
1765 – William Stukeley, English archaeologist and historian (b. 1687)
1768 – Nicola Porpora, Italian composer and educator (b. 1686)
1789 – Ghulam Kadir, leader of the Afghan Rohilla
1792 – Robert Adam, Scottish-English architect and politician, designed the Culzean Castle (b. 1728)
1850 – Oliver Cowdery, American religious leader (b. 1806)
1894 – Ned Williamson, American baseball player (b. 1857)

1901–present
1901 – George Gilman, American businessman, founded The Great Atlantic & Pacific Tea Company (b. 1826)
1905 – Antonio Annetto Caruana, Maltese archaeologist and author (b. 1830)
1927 – Mikhail Artsybashev, Ukrainian author and playwright (b. 1878)
  1927   – J. G. Parry-Thomas, Welsh race car driver and engineer (b. 1884)
1929 – Katharine Wright, American educator (b. 1874)
1932 – Eugen d'Albert, Scottish-German pianist and composer (b. 1864)
1943 – George Thompson, English cricketer and umpire (b. 1877)
1959 – Lou Costello, American actor and comedian (b. 1906)
1961 – Azizul Haq, Bengali Islamic scholar (b. 1903)
  1961   – Paul Wittgenstein, Austrian-American pianist (b. 1887)
1966 – Joseph Fields, American playwright, director, and producer (b. 1895)
  1966   – William Frawley, American actor and vaudevillian (b. 1887)
  1966   – Alice Pearce, American actress (b. 1917)
1981 – Rebecca Lancefield, American microbiologist and researcher (b. 1895)
1982 – Firaq Gorakhpuri, Indian poet and critic (b. 1896)
  1982   – Georges Perec, French author and screenwriter (b. 1936)
1983 – Hergé, Belgian author and illustrator (b. 1907)
1987 – Danny Kaye, American actor, singer, and dancer (b. 1911)
1988 – Henryk Szeryng, Polish-Mexican violinist and composer (b. 1918)
  1988   – Sewall Wright, American biologist and geneticist (b. 1889)
1990 – Charlotte Moore Sitterly, American astronomer (b. 1898)
1991 – Arthur Murray, American dancer and educator (b. 1895)
  1991   – William Penney, Baron Penney, Gibraltar-born English mathematician, physicist, and academic (b. 1909)
1993 – Mel Bradford, American author and critic (b. 1934)
  1993   – Carlos Marcello, Tunisian-American mob boss (b. 1910)
  1993   – Carlos Montoya, Spanish guitarist and composer (b. 1903)
  1993   – Albert Sabin, Polish-American physician and virologist (b. 1906)
1994 – John Edward Williams, American author and academic (b. 1922)
1995 – Howard W. Hunter, American religious leader, 14th President of The Church of Jesus Christ of Latter-day Saints (b. 1907)
1996 – Marguerite Duras, French author and director (b. 1914)
  1996   – John Krol, American cardinal (b. 1910)
1998 – Fred W. Friendly, American journalist and broadcaster (b. 1915)
1999 – Gerhard Herzberg, German-Canadian chemist and astronomer, Nobel Prize laureate (b. 1904)
  1999   – Lee Philips, American actor and director (b. 1927)
2000 – Toni Ortelli, Italian composer and conductor (b. 1904)
2001 – Louis Edmonds, American actor (b. 1923)
  2001   – Eugene Sledge, American soldier, author, and academic (b. 1923)
2002 – G. M. C. Balayogi, Indian lawyer and politician, 12th Speaker of the Lok Sabha (b. 1951)
2003 – Horst Buchholz, German actor (b. 1933)
  2003   – Luis Marden, American linguist, photographer, and explorer (b. 1913)
  2003   – Goffredo Petrassi, Italian composer and conductor (b. 1904)
2005 – Max Fisher, American businessman and philanthropist (b. 1928)
2006 – Ivor Cutler, Scottish poet and songwriter (b. 1923)
  2006   – Else Fisher, Australian-Swedish dancer, choreographer, and director (b. 1918)
  2006   – William Herskovic, Hungarian-American humanitarian (b. 1914)
2007 – Osvaldo Cavandoli, Italian cartoonist (b. 1920)
2008 – Giuseppe Di Stefano, Italian tenor and actor (b. 1921)
  2008   – Norman Smith, English drummer and producer (b. 1923)
2009 – Gilbert Parent, Canadian educator and politician, 33rd Speaker of the House of Commons of Canada (b. 1935)
2010 – Keith Alexander, English footballer and manager (b. 1956)
  2010   – Michael Foot, English journalist and politician, Secretary of State for Employment (b. 1913)
2011 – May Cutler, Canadian journalist, author, and politician (b. 1923)
2012 – Ralph McQuarrie, American conceptual designer and illustrator (b. 1929)
  2012   – Ronnie Montrose, American guitarist, songwriter, and producer (b. 1947)
  2012   – Alex Webster, American football player and coach (b. 1931)
2013 – Luis Cubilla, Uruguayan footballer and manager (b. 1940)
  2013   – Bobby Rogers, American singer-songwriter (b. 1940)
  2013   – James Strong, Qantas CEO from 1993 to 2001 (b. 1944)
2014 – Robert Ashley, American soldier and composer (b. 1930)
  2014   – Sherwin B. Nuland, American surgeon, author, and educator (b. 1930)
  2014   – William R. Pogue, American colonel, pilot, and astronaut (b. 1930)
2015 – Ernest Braun, Austrian-English physicist and academic (b. 1925)
  2015   – M. Stanton Evans, American journalist and author (b. 1934)
2016 – Hayabusa, Japanese wrestler (b. 1968)
  2016   – Berta Cáceres, Honduran environmentalist (b. 1973)
  2016   – Martin Crowe, New Zealand cricketer and sportscaster (b. 1962)
  2016   – Thanat Khoman, Thai politician and diplomat, Deputy Prime Minister of Thailand (b. 1914)
  2016   – Sarah Tait, Australian Olympic rower (b. 1983)
2017 – René Préval, Haitian politician (b. 1943)
2018 – Roger Bannister, English middle-distance athlete, first man to run a four-minute mile (b. 1929)
  2018   – Mal Bryce, Australian politician (b. 1943)
  2018   – Vanessa Goodwin, Australian politician (b. 1969)
  2018   – David Ogden Stiers, American actor, voice actor and musician  (b. 1942)
2019 – Peter Hurford OBE, British organist and composer (b. 1930)
2020 – Charles J. Urstadt, American real estate executive and investor (b. 1928)
2023 – Kenzaburō_Ōe, Japanese novelist, 1994 Nobel Prize laureate in Literature (b. 1935)

Holidays and observances
 Christian feast day:
 Anselm, Duke of Friuli
 Arthelais
 Cunigunde of Luxembourg
 Katharine Drexel
 John and Charles Wesley (Episcopal Church (USA))
 Marinus and Asterius of Caesarea
 Winwaloe
 March 3 (Eastern Orthodox liturgics)
 Hinamatsuri or "Girl's Day" (Japan)
 Liberation and Freedom Day (Charlottesville, Virginia, USA)
 Liberation Day (Bulgaria)
 Martyrs' Day (Malawi)
 Mother's Day (Georgia)
 Sportsmen's Day (Egypt)
 World Hearing Day
 World Wildlife Day

References

External links

 BBC: On This Day
 
 Historical Events on March 3

Days of the year
March